Niagara Region Transit is a regional public transit system operating in the Niagara Region of Ontario. Initial service commenced on September 12, 2011 and consisted of inter-municipal routes. In January 2023, Niagara Region Transit assumed the operations of Welland Transit, St. Catharines Transit, and Niagara Falls Transit to form a single unified local transit service for the entire Niagara Region.   

Service commenced the morning of September 12, 2011, and costs $6 per intercity trip, including transfer between two local municipal transit services. The service cost $5 for the first six months.

A regional paratransit service, Niagara Specialized Transit, has been in operation since November 2006 and operated by Canadian Red Cross.

In August 2020, a two-year pilot was launched to provide on-demand service for Grimsby, Lincoln, Pelham, Wainfleet and West Lincoln.

History 
Prior to the creation of Niagara Region Transit, inter-municipal transit in the Niagara Region was provided exclusively by local transit agencies which provided inconsistent services between local municipalities such as Welland Transit which operated a "link" route between Welland and Thorold or Niagara Falls Transit which operated a similar route between Fort Erie and Niagara Falls. On September 12, 2011, Niagara Region Transit began operating a network of 3 routes providing service between Welland, St. Catharines, and Niagara Falls as a temporary pilot project. This plan also included additional funding for existing link services between Niagara Falls and Fort Erie in addition to Welland and Port Colborne. This marked the first time since 1959 that a single transit agency was providing inter-municipal transit service across Niagara.

In March 2017, Niagara's Transportation Master Plan identified a lack of integrated regional transit as being one of the main obstacles preventing regular GO Train service to St. Catharines and Niagara Falls. The master plan proposed merging the services and operations of the region's three largest transit agencies (St. Catharines Transit, Niagara Falls Transit, and Welland Transit) into those of Niagara Region Transit. In December 2021, the plan was approved by the required triple majority as it was supported by a majority of Niagara's municipalities representing a majority of the regional population.

On January 1st, 2023, Niagara Region Transit began operating local transit services in St Catharines, Niagara Falls, and Welland. Services remained largely unchanged with the exception of extended service hours and changes to the fare structure. Although local transit agencies transferred their fleets to Niagara Region Transit, most of the buses continue to use the livery of their respective former local transit agency.

Routes
Routes were updated as of September, 2018.

Roster

All NRT buses are equipped with bike racks.

As of February 2023, the vast majority of Niagara Region Transit's fleet that was acquired from Welland Transit, Niagara Falls Transit, and St. Catharines Transit has yet to be converted to the new livery and so the buses continue to use their respective former local transit agency's livery.

References

External links
Niagara Region Transit
Niagara Region Transit Photo Galleries at Bus Drawings

Transport in Welland
Transport in St. Catharines
Transport in Niagara Falls, Ontario
Transit agencies in Ontario